Andrew Bernardi (born 22 April 1965) is an English violinist, educator, festival director and entrepreneur.

He lives in the parish of Shipley near Horsham, and has performed with many of the UK's leading orchestras, including Guildford Philharmonic Orchestra, the Royal Philharmonic Orchestra and The Bernardi Music Group. He is a member of staff at Trinity Laban Conservatoire of Music and Dance. He has founded Bernardi Music Group, Shipley Arts Festival, Stradivarius Piano Trio, String Academy.  The Shipley Arts Festival has commissioned new works, including 'Great Hill's' by Cecilia McDowall, 'The Margraves Dream' by Malcolm Singer and 'To Notice Such Things' by the late Jon Lord (formerly of Deep Purple).  He has for many years collaborated with the Yehudi Menuhin School, with whom he is closing the 2019 Shipley Festival with Malcolm Singer's Dragons.

He has performed as guest concertmaster for Manchester Camerata, the Oporto Chamber Orchestra, and leading Bernardi Music Group. He is married to Lucy Bernardi and they have a son, Joshua Bernardi.

Bernardi was educated at The Skinners' School, Tunbridge Wells, Leeds University Bretton Hall and Trinity College of Music, where he led all the orchestras as a postgraduate scholar. Bernardi plays on a Stradivarius violin, and violin bow formerly owned by Yehudi Menuhin.

References

1965 births
Living people
English violinists
British male violinists
Alumni of the University of Leeds
Alumni of Trinity College of Music
Skinners
21st-century violinists
21st-century British male musicians